Donghai Subdistrict is a subdistrict in the southeast corner of Hexi District, Tianjin, China. It shares border with Chentangzhuang Subdistrict in the north and east, Taihu Road Subdistrict in the south, and Jianshan Subdistrict in the west. Its population was 80,013 as of the 2020 census.

The subdistrict's name Donghai literally means "East Sea".

History

Administrative divisions 
In 2021, Donghai Subdistrict was divided into 12 residential communities. They are listed as follows:

References 

Township-level divisions of Tianjin
Hexi District, Tianjin